The Berwick-on-Tweed Act 1836 (6 & 7 Will. 4 c. 103; long title An Act to make temporary Provision for the Boundaries of certain Boroughs) was an act of the Parliament of the United Kingdom passed to remedy some defects of the Municipal Corporations Act 1835. It was also referred to as the Municipal Boundaries Bill and the Municipal Corporation (Boundaries) Act 1836.

Background
A more comprehensive amendment of the 1835 act had been introduced by the second Melbourne ministry in the Commons in the 1836 parliamentary session (6 & 7 Will. 4), but the Lords objected to it, and so three short bills were introduced and passed the week before prorogation to deal with urgent uncontroversial changes. Besides the boundaries act (c. 103) were acts "for the better Administration of the Borough Fund in certain Boroughs" (c. 104) and "for the better Administration of Justice in certain Boroughs" (c. 105).  The boundaries act was expressed as making "temporary Provision" because the government intended to bring in a broader measure later; however, the ensuing bill was rejected in 1838.

Provisions
The act as passed had six sections:
 Section 1 replaced a provision of the 1835 act which annexed to a municipal borough any adjacent liberties. The new provision annexed only liberties which were within the municipal boundary. A consequence was that non-municipal land within a county corporate would be transferred to the adjoining county-at-large, as when the Ainsty of York was transferred from the city of York to the West Riding of Yorkshire. 
 Section 2 reduced the municipal boundaries of Sunderland to the parish of Sunderland, the townships of Monkwearmouth and Monkwearmouth Shore, and the part of the townships of Bishopwearmouth and Bishopwearmouth Panns within a mile of Wearmouth Bridge. The 1835 act had used the Sunderland parliamentary boundary defined in 1832, which encompassed all of Bishopwearmouth, Bishopwearmouth Panns, and Southwick.
 Section 3 was a saver where a barrister who had assigned wards under the 1835 act specified places straddling the municipal boundary.
 Section 4 specified that local acts for poor relief would not be affected by the 1835 act.
 Section 5 specified that county rates would not be affected by the 1835 act
 Section 6 declared Berwick-upon-Tweed to be a county corporate. This applied for all purposes except parliamentary elections, in which the Berwick-upon-Tweed constituency remained a parliamentary borough rather than a county borough constituency.

Amendment and repeal
The Municipal Corporations (New Charters) Act 1877 assigned the short title "The Municipal Corporation (Boundaries) Act, 1836". The Municipal Corporations Act 1882 repealed all sections of c. 103 except that relating to Berwick, which was amended by the Statute Law Revision (No. 2) Act 1888. The short title "Berwick-on-Tweed Act 1836" was given by the Short Titles Act 1896. The act was finally repealed by  The Local Authorities etc. (Miscellaneous Provision) (No. 2) Order 1974, a statutory instrument made under the Local Government Act 1972, which had made sweeping changes to local government in England and Wales.

References

Sources
 
 

1974 disestablishments in the United Kingdom
19th century in York

History of Berwick-upon-Tweed
History of Tyne and Wear
Local government legislation in England and Wales
Repealed United Kingdom Acts of Parliament
Sunderland
United Kingdom Acts of Parliament 1836